The defense industry of Ukraine is a strategically important sector and a large employer in Ukraine. After working for several decades mostly for the arms export markets, in 2014 it has moved significantly into increased Ukrainian military procurement since the start  of the war in Donbas.

Prior to 2014, Ukraine's export-oriented arms industry had reached the status of world's 4th largest arms exporter in 2012. Since the start of the War in Donbas, Ukraine's military industry has focused more on its internal arms market and as a result slipped to the 9th spot among top global arms exporters by 2015, 11th spot by 2018 and the 12th spot among global arms exporters by 2019.

In 2019 the main importers of Ukrainian weapons were India, Saudi Arabia and Turkey.

History

Ukraine's defense industry was a major part of the Soviet defense industry, responsible for 17% of Soviet defense production and 25% of its scientific research. Some Soviet ICBMs were actually built at the Yuzhmash plant in the Ukrainian city of Dnipro. Russia's only aircraft carrier was also built in the Ukrainian SSR, as well as a number of other Russian military ships.

At the time Ukraine declared independence in 1991, the country had 1,840 defense enterprises and research centers that employed close to 2.7 million people. A number of facilities had unique capabilities such as shipbuilding and missile production. But it was not a cohesive defense industry, but rather fragments of the defense industry of the Soviet Union.

From 1992 to 1996 113 Ukrainian enterprises were engaged in dual-use goods, including weapons. The lack of clear legislation resulted in an arms market where everyone earned what he could and how he could, including in semi-illegal schemes. The state took control of Ukraine's defense industry in October 1996, creating the concern Ukrspetsexport.

From 1992 to 2014 Ukrainian military exports mainly consisted of three unequal components: the supply of new or warehouse equipment, joint development of specific orders and maintenance of Soviet-made machinery and equipment. The output of Ukrainian defense plants grew 58% in 2009, with largest growth reported by aircraft builders (77%) and ship builders (71%). Until 2011, the first place for Ukraine in terms of profitability was the sale of aircraft and the provision of services for its modernization and repair. In second place was armored vehicles. In 2011 trade in armored vehicles (including the export of the T-84 Oplot to Thailand) replaced the military aviation export as most profitable military exports, and since then third place has traditionally been occupied by trade in air defense equipment. In 2012 (by far Ukraine's most successful year of arms export) Ukraine had the status of world's 4th largest arms exporter. In 2013 Ukraine's defense sector manufactured a total of 11.7 billion Ukrainian hryvnia (₴) worth of goods, ₴10 billion of which were exported. Prior to 2014 a major part of Ukraine's military business was the selling of Soviet-era stockpiles.

Since the 2014 start of the war in Donbas, Ukraine's military industry focused more on its internal arms market and started to export significantly fewer abroad. Before 2014 Ukrainian producers had not received significant revenues from the Armed Forces of Ukraine. In the first 9 months of 2014 Ukraine's defense sector produced a record 13 billion UAH worth of goods, the increase was largely due to government orders for the war in Donbas. Meanwhile, the Ukrainian army began to buy weapons, ammunition and equipment abroad en masse. And since every year the percentage of such imports increases. As a result of Ukraine's arms manufacturing refocus on its own military needs, it slipped to the 9th spot among top global arms exporters by 2015.

After 2015 Ukraine's defence industry stabilized, but Ukraine failed to return to its former exports. In 2018 Ukraine occupied the 11th spot among global arms exporters. And in 2019 the 12th spot. According to Stockholm International Peace Research Institute (SIPRI), Ukraine's share in the world arms market was 2.7% in 2009-2014 and in 2014-2018 1.3%. The structure of exports also changed: the main part was made up of high-tech products such as guided anti-tank missiles. The business of trading in Soviet stocks has come to naught - the warehouses were emptied by the war in Donbas. In 2019 the main importers of Ukrainian weapons were India, Saudi Arabia and Turkey.

One of major part of export was gas turbine engines for ships (mainly Indian Navy) and helicopter engines and aircraft engines for unmanned aerial vehicles like Baykar Bayraktar Akıncı and Baykar Bayraktar Kızılelma.

Ukraine conduct military exhibition  (Arms and Security).

An augmented reality system LimpidArmor for armored vehicles was presented at the XIII International Specialized Exhibition "Weapons and Security 2016".

In 2016  was presented, with several other software solutions for armed forces like GisArta, MyGun, Topo, Kropyva, Dzvin-AS, Prostir.

Number of small arms like Snipex M, Snipex T-Rex, Snipex Alligator, Zbroyar Z-10, M4-WAC-47, Malyuk, 

Number of armoured vehicle like T-84, BTR-3, BTR-4, Otaman, 

Was developed anti-ship missile complex R-360 Neptune.

In war there was developed first 155mm self-propelled howitzer 2S22 Bohdana with precisious munition  and MRLS Vilkha, Verba, . UAV's , A1-CM Furia,  a number of MRAP like Dozor-B, Kozak, Novator and ATGM's like Skif and RK-3 Corsar. Jet infantry flamethrower ,  and termobaric grenade 

Structure

Defense industry of Ukraine is the most advanced branch of the state-controlled sector of Ukraine's economy. Ukraine's defense industry employs more than one million people and produces advanced hardware and continues to design and build new military systems.

Ukraine's defense industry is organized around Ukroboronprom, a state owned conglomerate of over 130 companies. These companies include Soviet era giants such as Ivchenko-Progress aircraft design bureau that was opened in 1945, to newer companies such as RPC Fort which came into existence in the 1990s.

In August 2018 the Groysman government simplified the procedure for granting economic entities the right to export and import military goods and goods that contain data that constitute a state secret. This opened the market for private defense companies, which previously could only work with foreign clients through a state-owned company.

In October 2018, speaking at the Atlantic Council in Washington, US Special Representative for Ukraine Kurt Volker said that the United States had lifted the arms embargo on Ukraine. This gave big boost to the international cooperation and development of private companies.

On 22 July 2020 the new government ministry Ministry of Strategic Industries of Ukraine was established to aid and develop Ukraine's defence industry.

Major manufacturers

Aircraft 
See: 
 Antonov (Kyiv)
Antonov Serial Production Plant (Kyiv)
 Kyiv Aircraft Repair Plant 410 (Kyiv)
  (Kharkiv)
 General Aviation Design Bureau of Ukraine (Kyiv)
 
 
  (Konotop)

Armored vehicles, automotive, and special engineering equipment 
 Kharkiv Factory of Transportation Machine-building of Malyshev (Kharkiv)
Kharkiv Morozov Machine Building Design Bureau (Kharkiv)
 
 
 
 
 
 Kremenchuk Automobile Plant KrAZ (Kremenchuk)

Engine 
Motor-Sich (Zaporizhzhia)
Ivchenko-Progress (Zaporizhzhia)
 Zorya-Mashproekt (Mykolaiv)

Shipbuilding 

 Azov Shipyard (Mariupol)
 State Research and Design Shipbuilding Center (Mykolaiv)
 Black Sea Shipyard (Mykolaiv)
 Kherson Shipyard (Kherson)
 Kuznya na Rybalskomu (Kyiv)
 Mykolayiv Shipyard (Mykolaiv)
 More (Feodosia*)
 Okean Shipyard (Mykolaiv)
 Sevastopol Shipyard (Sevastopol*)
 Zalyv (Kerch*)

An  indicates that the city is located in Russian occupied Crimea. Ukraine rejects Russia's annexation of Crimea as does the majority of sovereign states in the world, but Russia has had de facto control over Crimea since 2014.

Rocket 
 Pivdenmash (Dnipro)
Pivdenne Design Bureau (Kharkiv)

Electronics 
 Luch Design Bureau
 
 
 Infozahyst

Radiolocation

Artillery

Firearms 
 RPC Fort (Vinnytsia)
 
 Zbroyar

Protection gear 
 Ukrainian Armor

Munition

Explosives

Optics 
 Arsenal Factory

Other
 Khartron (Kharkiv)

See also
List of armoured fighting vehicles of Ukraine
Armed Forces of Ukraine
List of design bureaus in Ukraine
List of Ukrainian weaponry makers
Shipbuilding in Ukraine
Aircraft industry of Ukraine
Ukrainian Navy
Nuclear weapons and Ukraine
T-84 Oplot

References 

 
Ukraine
Military of Ukraine